William Frederic Marquat (March 17, 1894 – May 29, 1960) was a major general in the US Army. Prior to his service in the military, Marquat was a reporter for The Seattle Times. Prior to the Japanese invasion of 1941, Marquat served with the Office of the Military Advisor to the Commonwealth Government of the Philippines, as the chief engineering advisor.

Early life
Marquat was born on March 17, 1894, in St. Louis, Missouri to William and Sara (Layden) Marquat. He moved to the state of Washington and was commissioned as a second lieutenant in the Washington National Guard Coast Artillery Corps in October 1916. Marquat was called to federal service for World War I in July 1917 and served as a temporary captain from October 1918 to July 1919. After the war, he returned to The Seattle Times as automobile editor. Marquat accepted a commission as a captain in the Regular Army in September 1920.

Military career timeline

Military Timeline 

World War I—Coast Artillery Office
 Post World War I
 1932–1933—Student officer at Command and General Staff School
World War II
 Staff officer to General MacArthur
 Commander of the 14th Anti-Aircraft Command
 Post World War II
 Chair of the Allied Council for Japan
 1945–1952—Head of the Economics and Science Section General Headquarters for the Supreme Allied Powers - Tokyo, Japan
 1952–1955—Chief of Civil Affairs and Military Government
 1955—retires

History 
Following the restoration of the capital of the Republic of Korea to its President and before the Seoul area was free of enemy activity, General Marquat, completely disregarding his own safety, toured the region by vehicle to obtain first-hand information vital to planning effective anti-aircraft installations necessary to forestall surprise enemy air attacks. Later, in anticipation of increased enemy air activity, General Marquat traveled over terrain harassed by sniper fire and endangered by land mines to inspect anti-aircraft installations. His personal concern for his troops, aggressive actions in ground surveillance, and presence in the forward areas inspired his units to a high degree of efficiency and contributed materially to the United Nations effort in Korea. General Marquat's inspirational courage and his unfaltering devotion to duty as a leader upholds the highest traditions of the military service.

Awards 
Distinguished Service Cross - for actions during World War II

2 - Army Distinguished Service Medals - for actions during World War II

1 - Army Distinguished Service Medal - for actions during the Cold War

1 - Silver Star - for actions during World War II

1 - Silver Star - for actions during the Korean War

Air Medal - for actions during World War II

Later life
Marquat and his wife Eula lived in Washington, D.C. after his retirement. He suffered a stroke in 1959. Marquat died on May 29, 1960, at 3:00 am at Walter Reed Hospital. He was interred at Arlington National Cemetery three days later.

Marquat library
The Marquat Library was formed, in 1969, at Fort Gordon, Georgia, at the US Army Civil Affairs School. The library was moved, in 1973 when the school moved to Fort Bragg, North Carolina.

See also
 Douglas MacArthur's escape from the Philippines
 M-Fund
 Yamashita's gold

References 

1894 births
1960 deaths
People from St. Louis
The Seattle Times people
Washington National Guard personnel
American military personnel of World War I
United States Army Command and General Staff College alumni
American people in the American Philippines
United States Army generals of World War II
Recipients of the Air Medal
Recipients of the Silver Star
Recipients of the Distinguished Service Cross (United States)
Recipients of the Distinguished Service Medal (US Army)
United States Army generals
United States Army personnel of the Korean War
Military personnel from Washington, D.C.
Burials at Arlington National Cemetery